Catharina Margaretha Honig (1894-1957) was a Dutch painter known for her still lifes.

Biography 
Honig was born on 10 December 1894 in Koog aan de Zaan. She studied at the Rijksakademie van beeldende kunsten (State Academy of Fine Arts) in Amsterdam. Her teachers included Félicien Bobeldijk and Coba Ritsema. Honig's work was included in the 1939 exhibition and sale Onze Kunst van Heden (Our Art of Today) at the Rijksmuseum in Amsterdam.

Honig died on 10 March 1957 in Haarlem.

References

External links
images of Honig's art on Invaluable

1894 births
1957 deaths
People from Zaanstad
Dutch women artists